Quebec is one of the thirteen provinces and territories of Canada. It is the largest province by area and the second-largest by population. Much of the population lives in urban areas along the St. Lawrence River, between the most populous city, Montreal, and the provincial capital, Quebec City. Quebec is the home of the Québécois nation. Located in Central Canada, the province shares land borders with Ontario to the west, Newfoundland and Labrador to the northeast, New Brunswick to the southeast, and a coastal border with Nunavut; in the south it borders Maine, New Hampshire, Vermont, and New York in the United States.

Between 1534 and 1763, Quebec was called Canada and was the most developed colony in New France. Following the Seven Years' War, Quebec became a British colony: first as the Province of Quebec (1763–1791), then Lower Canada (1791–1841), and lastly Canada East (1841–1867), as a result of the Lower Canada Rebellion. It was confederated with Ontario, Nova Scotia, and New Brunswick in 1867, beginning the Dominion of Canada. Until the early 1960s, the Catholic Church played a large role in the social and cultural institutions in Quebec. However, the Quiet Revolution of the 1960s to 1980s increased the role of the Government of Quebec in l'État québécois (the state of Quebec).

The Government of Quebec functions within the context of a Westminster system and is both a liberal democracy and a constitutional monarchy. The Premier of Quebec, presently François Legault, acts as head of government. Québécois political culture mostly differs on a nationalist-vs-federalist continuum, rather than a left-vs-right continuum. Independence debates have played a large role in politics. Quebec society's cohesion and specificity is based on three of its unique statutory documents: the Quebec Charter of Human Rights and Freedoms, the Charter of the French Language, and the Civil Code of Quebec. Furthermore, unlike elsewhere in Canada, law in Quebec is mixed: private law is exercised under a civil-law system, while public law is exercised under a common-law system.

Quebec's official language is French; Québécois French is the regional variety. The economy of Quebec is mainly supported by its large service sector and varied industrial sector. For exports, it leans on the key industries of aeronautics, hydroelectricity, mining, pharmaceuticals, aluminum, wood, and paper. Quebec is well known for producing maple syrup, for its comedy, and for making hockey one of the most popular sports in Canada. It is also renowned for its culture; the province produces literature, music, films, TV shows, festivals, folklore, and more.

Etymology
The name Québec comes from an Algonquin word meaning 'narrow passage' or 'strait'. The name originally referred to the area around Quebec City where the Saint Lawrence River narrows to a cliff-lined gap. Early variations in the spelling included Québecq and Kébec. French explorer Samuel de Champlain chose the name Québec in 1608 for the colonial outpost he would use as the administrative seat for New France.

History

Indigenous peoples and European expeditions (pre-1608) 

The Paleo-Indians theorized to have migrated from Asia to America between 20,000 and 14,000 years ago, were the first people to establish themselves on the lands of Quebec, arriving there after the Laurentide Ice Sheet melted roughly 11,000 years ago. From them, many ethnocultural groups emerged. At the time of the European explorations of the 1500s, there were eleven Indigenous peoples: the Inuit and ten First Nations the Abenakis, Algonquins (or Anichinabés), Atikamekw, Cree, Huron-Wyandot, Maliseet (also known as Wolastoqiyik or Etchemin), Miꞌkmaqs, Iroquois, Innu (or Montagnais) and Naskapis. At the time, Algonquians organized into seven political entities and lived nomadic lives based on hunting, gathering, and fishing. Inuit, on the other hand, fished and hunted whales and seals along the coasts of Hudson and Ungava Bay.

In the 15th century, the Byzantine Empire fell, prompting Western Europeans to search for new sea routes to the Far East. Around 1522–1523, Giovanni da Verrazzano persuaded King Francis I of France to commission an expedition to find a western route to Cathay (China) via a Northwest Passage. Though this expedition was unsuccessful, it established the name "New France" for northeastern North America. In his first expedition ordered from the Kingdom of France, Jacques Cartier became the first European explorer to discover and map Quebec when he landed in Gaspé on July 24, 1534. After wintering in Stadacona, Cartier returned to France with about 10 St. Lawrence Iroquoians, including Chief Donnacona. In 1540, Donnacona told the legend of the Kingdom of Saguenay to the King of France. This inspired the king to order a third expedition, this time led by Jean-François de La Rocque de Roberval; it was unsuccessful in its goal of finding the kingdom.

After these expeditions, France mostly abandoned North America for 50 years because of its financial crisis; France was involved in the Italian Wars and there were religious wars between Protestants and Catholics. Around 1580, the rise of the fur trade (particularly the demand for beaver pelts) reignited French interest; New France became a colonial trading post. In 1603, Samuel de Champlain travelled to the Saint Lawrence River and, on Pointe Saint-Mathieu, established a defence pact with the Innu, Maliseet and Micmacs, that would be "a decisive factor in the maintenance of a French colonial enterprise in America despite an enormous numerical disadvantage vis-à-vis the British". Thus also began French military support to the Algonquian and Huron peoples against Iroquois attacks; these would become known as the Iroquois Wars and would last from the early 1600s to the early 1700s.

New France (1608–1763)

In 1608, Samuel de Champlain returned to the region as head of an exploration party. On July 3, 1608, with the support of King Henry IV, he founded the Habitation de Québec (now Quebec City) and made it the capital of New France and its regions (which, at the time, were Acadia, Canada and Plaisance in Newfoundland). The settlement was built as a permanent fur trading outpost, where First Nations traded their furs for French goods, such as metal objects, guns, alcohol, and clothing. Several missionary groups arrived in New France after the founding of Quebec City, like the Recollects in 1615, the Jesuits in 1625 and the Supliciens in 1657. Coureurs des bois and Catholic missionaries used river canoes to explore the interior of the North American continent and establish fur trading forts.

The Compagnie des Cent-Associés, which had been granted a royal mandate to manage New France in 1627, introduced the Custom of Paris and the seigneurial system, and forbade settlement in New France by anyone other than Roman Catholics. In 1629, Quebec City surrendered, without battle, to English privateers led by David Kirke during the Anglo-French War; in 1632, the English king agreed to return it with the Treaty of Saint-Germain-en-Laye. Trois-Rivières was founded at Samuel de Champlain's request in 1634. Paul de Chomedey de Maisonneuve founded Ville-Marie (now Montreal) in 1642. 

In 1663, the Company of New France ceded Canada to King Louis XIV, who officially made New France into a royal province of France. New France was now a true colony administered by the Sovereign Council of New France from Quebec City. A governor-general, assisted by the intendant of New France and the bishop of Quebec City, governed Canada and its administrative dependencies: Acadia, Louisiana and Plaisance. The French settlers were mostly farmers and were known as "Canadiens" or "Habitants". Though there was little immigration, the colony still grew because of the Habitants' high birth rates. In 1665, the Carignan-Salières regiment developed the string of fortifications known as the "Valley of Forts" to protect against Iroquois invasions and brought along with them 1,200 new men. To redress the severe gender imbalance and boost population growth, King Louis XIV sponsored the passage of approximately 800 young French women (King's Daughters) to the colony. In 1666, intendant Jean Talon organized the first census and counted 3,215 Habitants. Talon also enacted policies to diversify agriculture and encourage births, which, in 1672, had increased the population to 6,700.

New France's territory grew to extend from Hudson Bay all the way to the Gulf of Mexico, and would also encompass the Great Lakes. In the early 1700s, Governor Callières concluded the Great Peace of Montreal, which not only confirmed the alliance between the Algonquian and New France, but also definitively ended the Iroquois Wars. From 1688 onwards, the fierce competition between the French and British to control North America's interior and monopolize the fur trade pitted New France and its Indigenous allies against the Iroquois and English in a series of four successive wars called the French and Indian Wars by Americans, and the Intercolonial Wars in Quebec. The first three of these wars were King William's War (1688–1697), Queen Anne's War (1702–1713), and King George's War (1744–1748). In 1690, the Battle of Quebec became the first time Quebec City's defences were tested. In 1713, following the Peace of Utrecht, the Duke of Orléans ceded Acadia and Plaisance Bay to Great Britain, but retained Île Saint-Jean (Prince Edward Island), and Île-Royale (Cape Breton Island) where the Fortress of Louisbourg was subsequently erected. These losses were significant since Plaisance Bay was the primary communication route between New France and France, and Acadia contained 5,000 Acadians. In the siege of Louisbourg in 1745, the British were victorious, but returned the city to France after war concessions.

The last of the four French and Indian Wars was called the Seven Years' War ("The War of the Conquest" in Quebec) and lasted from 1754 to 1763. In 1754, tensions escalated for control of the Ohio Valley, as authorities in New France became more aggressive in their efforts to expel British traders and colonists from the area. In 1754, George Washington launched a surprise attack on a group of sleeping Canadien soldiers, known as the Battle of Jumonville Glen, the first battle of the war. In 1755, Governor Charles Lawrence and Officer Robert Monckton ordered the forceful Deportation of the Acadians. In 1758, on Île-Royale, British General James Wolfe besieged and captured the Fortress of Louisbourg. This allowed him to control access to the Gulf of St. Lawrence through the Cabot Strait. In 1759, he besieged Quebec for nearly three months from Île d'Orléans. Then, Wolfe stormed Quebec and fought against Montcalm for control of the city in the Battle of the Plains of Abraham. After a British victory, the king's lieutenant and Lord of Ramezay concluded the Articles of Capitulation of Quebec. During the spring of 1760, the Chevalier de Lévis besieged Quebec City and forced the British to entrench themselves during the Battle of Sainte-Foy. However, the loss of the French vessels sent to resupply New France after the fall of Quebec City during the Battle of Restigouche marked the end of France's efforts to try to retake the colony. Governor Pierre de Rigaud, marquis de Vaudreuil-Cavagnial signed the Articles of Capitulation of Montreal on September 8, 1760.

While awaiting the results of the Seven Years' War in Europe, New France was put under a British military regime led by Governor James Murray. In 1762, Commander Jeffery Amherst ended the French presence in Newfoundland at the Battle of Signal Hill. Two months later, France secretly ceded the western part of Louisiana and the Mississippi River Delta to Spain via the Treaty of Fontainebleau. On February 10, 1763, the Treaty of Paris concluded the war. With the exception of the small islands of Saint Pierre and Miquelon, France ceded its North American possessions to Great Britain. Thus, France had put an end to New France and abandoned the remaining 60,000 Canadiens, who sided with the Catholic clergy in refusing to take an oath to the British Crown. The rupture from France would provoke a transformation within the descendants of the Canadiens that would eventually result in the birth of a new nation.

British North America (1763–1867)

After the British officially acquired Canada in 1763, the British government established a constitution for the newly acquired territory, under the Royal Proclamation. From this point on, the Canadiens were subordinated to the government of the British Empire and circumscribed to a region of the St. Lawrence Valley and Anticosti Island called the Province of Quebec. With unrest growing in the colonies to the south, the British were worried that the Canadiens (the majority of the Quebec population) might support what would become the American Revolution. To secure the allegiance of Canadiens to the British crown, Governor James Murray and later Governor Guy Carleton promoted the need for accommodations, resulting in the enactment of the Quebec Act of 1774. This act allowed Canadiens to regain their civil customs, return to the seigneural system, regain certain rights (including the use of the French language), and reappropriate their old territories: Labrador, the Great Lakes, the Ohio Valley, Illinois Country and the Indian Territory.

As early as 1774, the Continental Congress of the separatist Thirteen Colonies attempted to rally the Canadiens to its cause. However, its military troops failed to defeat the British counteroffensive during its Invasion of Quebec in 1775. Most Canadiens remained neutral, although some patriotic regiments allied themselves with the Americans in the Saratoga campaign of 1777. When the British Empire recognized the independence of the rebel colonies at the signing of the Treaty of Paris of 1783, it conceded Illinois and the Ohio Valley to the newly formed United States and denoted the 45th parallel as its border, drastically reducing Quebec's size.

United Empire Loyalists from the US migrated to Quebec and populated various regions, including the Niagara Peninsula, the Eastern Townships and Thousand Islands. Dissatisfied with the many rights granted to Canadiens and wanting to use the British legal system to which they were accustomed, the Loyalists protested to British authorities until the Constitutional Act of 1791 was enacted, dividing the Province of Quebec into two distinct colonies starting from the Ottawa River: Upper Canada to the west (predominantly Anglo-Protestant) and Lower Canada to the east (predominantly Franco-Catholic). Lower Canada's lands consisted of the coasts of the Saint Lawrence River, Labrador and Anticosti Island, with the territory extending north to the boundary of Rupert's Land, and extending south, east and west to the borders with the US, New Brunswick, and Upper Canada. The creation of Upper and Lower Canada allowed Loyalists to live under British laws and institutions, while Canadiens could maintain their familiar French civil law and Catholic religion. Furthermore, Governor Haldimand drew Loyalists away from Quebec City and Montreal by offering free land on the northern shore of Lake Ontario to anyone willing to swear allegiance to George III. During the War of 1812, Charles-Michel de Salaberry became a hero by leading the Canadian troops to victory at the Battle of the Chateauguay. This loss caused the Americans to abandon the Saint Lawrence Campaign, their major strategic effort to conquer Canada.

Gradually, the Legislative Assembly of Lower Canada, who represented the people, came into conflict with the superior authority of the Crown and its appointed representatives. Starting in 1791, the government of Lower Canada was criticized and contested by the Parti canadien. In 1834, the Parti canadien presented its 92 resolutions, a series of political demands which expressed a loss of confidence in the British monarchy. Discontentment intensified throughout the public meetings of 1837, and the Lower Canada Rebellion began in 1837. In 1837, Louis-Joseph Papineau and Robert Nelson led residents of Lower Canada to form an armed resistance group called the Patriotes. They made a Declaration of Independence in 1838, guaranteeing human rights and equality for all citizens without discrimination. Their actions resulted in rebellions in both Lower and Upper Canada. The Patriotes forces were victorious in their first battle, the Battle of Saint-Denis. However, the Patriotes were unorganized and badly equipped, leading to their loss against the British army in their second battle, the Battle of Saint-Charles, and their defeat in their final battle, the Battle of Saint-Eustache.

In response to the rebellions, Lord Durham was asked to undertake a study and prepare a report offering a solution to the British Parliament. In his report, Lord Durham recommended that Canadiens be culturally assimilated, with English as their only official language. In order to do this, the British passed the Act of Union 1840, which merged Upper Canada and Lower Canada into a single colony: the Province of Canada. Lower Canada became the francophone and densely populated Canada East, and Upper Canada became the anglophone and sparsely populated Canada West. This union, unsurprisingly, was the main source of political instability until 1867. Despite their population gap, both Canada East and Canada West obtained an identical number of seats in the Legislative Assembly of the Province of Canada, which created representation problems. In the beginning, Canada East was under-represented because of its superior population size. Over time, however, massive immigration from the British Isles to Canada West occurred, which increased its population. Since the two regions continued to have equal representation in the Parliament, this meant that it was now Canada West that was under-represented. The representation issues were frequently called into question by debates on "Representation by Population". In this period, the Loyalists and immigrants from the British Isles appropriated the term "Canadian", referring to Canada, their place of residence. The "Old Canadians" responded to this appropriation of identity by henceforth identifying with their ethnic community, under the name "French Canadian".

As access to new lands remained problematic because they were still monopolized by the Clique du Château, an exodus of Canadiens towards New England began and went on for the next one hundred years. This phenomenon is known as the Grande Hémorragie and greatly threatened the survival of the Canadien nation. The massive British immigration ordered from London that soon followed the failed rebellion compounded this problem. In order to combat this, the Church adopted the revenge of the cradle policy. In 1844, the capital of the Province of Canada was moved from Kingston to Montreal.

Political unrest came to a head in 1849, when English Canadian rioters set fire to the Parliament Building in Montreal following the enactment of the Rebellion Losses Bill, a law that compensated French Canadians whose properties were destroyed during the rebellions of 1837–1838. This bill, resulting from the Baldwin-La Fontaine coalition and Lord Elgin's advice, was a very important one as it established the notion of responsible government. In 1854, the seigneurial system was abolished, the Grand Trunk Railway was built and the Canadian–American Reciprocity Treaty was implemented. In 1866, the Civil Code of Lower Canada was adopted.

Canadian province (1867–present)

In 1864, negotiations began for Canadian Confederation between the Province of Canada, New Brunswick and Nova Scotia. There were two conferences that year:  the first conference, the Charlottetown Conference, and the second, the Quebec Conference at Quebec City.

After having fought as a Patriote, George-Étienne Cartier entered politics in the Province of Canada, eventually becoming one of the co-premiers and an advocate for the union of the British North American provinces. He became one of the leading figures at the Quebec Conference, which produced the Quebec Resolutions, the foundation for Canadian Confederation. Recognized as a Father of Confederation, he successfully argued for the establishment of the province of Quebec, initially composed of the historic heart of the territory of the French Canadian nation and where French Canadians would most likely retain majority status. 

The Quebec Resolutions were implemented as the British North America Act, 1867, passed by the British Parliament at the request of the governments of the Province of Canada, New Brunswick, and Nova Scotia, following the London Conference of 1866.  The British North America Act, 1867 was brought into force on July 1, 1867, creating Canada.  It was composed of four founding provinces: New Brunswick, Nova Scotia, Ontario and Quebec. These last two came from the splitting of the Province of Canada, and used the old borders of Lower Canada for Quebec, and Upper Canada for Ontario.  On July 15, 1867, Pierre-Joseph-Olivier Chauveau became Quebec's first premier.

From Confederation until the First World War, the omnipresence of the Roman Catholic Church was at its peak. The objective of clerico-nationalists was promoting the values of traditional society: family, the French language, the Catholic Church and rural life. Also during this time period, events such as the North-West Rebellion, the Manitoba Schools Question and Ontario's Regulation 17 turned the promotion and defence of the rights of French Canadians into an important concern. Under the aegis of the Catholic Church and the political action of Henri Bourassa, various symbols of national pride were developed, like the Flag of Carillon, and "O Canada" – a patriotic song composed for Saint-Jean-Baptiste Day. In 1885, liberal and conservative MPs formed the Parti national out of anger with the previous government for not having interceded in the execution of Louis Riel.

In 1898, the Canadian Parliament enacted the Quebec Boundary Extension Act, 1898, which gave Quebec part of Rupert's Land, which Canada had bought from the Hudson's Bay Company in 1870. This act expanded the boundaries of Quebec northward. In 1910, Armand Lavergne passed the Lavergne Law, the first language legislation in Quebec. It required the use of French alongside English on tickets, documents, bills and contracts issued by transportation and public utility companies. At this time, companies rarely recognized the majority language of Quebec. Clerico-nationalists eventually started to fall out of favour in the federal elections of 1911. In 1912, the Canadian Parliament enacted the Quebec Boundaries Extension Act, 1912, which gave Quebec another part of Rupert's Land: the District of Ungava. This extended the borders of Quebec northward all the way to the Hudson Strait.

When the First World War broke out, Canada was automatically involved and many English Canadians volunteered. However, because they did not feel the same connection to the British Empire and there was no direct threat to Canada, French Canadians saw no reason to fight. A few did enlist in the 22nd Battalion, precursor to the Royal 22e Régiment. By late 1916, the number of casualties were beginning to cause reinforcement problems. After enormous difficulty in the federal government, because virtually every French-speaking MP opposed conscription while almost all the English-speaking MPs supported it, the Military Service Act became law on August 29, 1917.

In 1919, the prohibition of spirits was enacted following a provincial referendum. But, prohibition was quickly abolished in 1921 due to the Alcoholic Beverages Act which created the Commission des liqueurs du Québec. In 1927, the British Judicial Committee of the Privy Council drew a clear border between northeast Quebec and south Labrador. However, the Quebec government did not recognize the ruling of the Judicial Committee, resulting in a boundary dispute which remains ongoing. The Statute of Westminster 1931 was enacted, and it confirmed the autonomy of the Dominions – including Canada and its provinces – from the United Kingdom, as well as their free association in the Commonwealth. In the 1930s, Quebec's economy was affected by the Great Depression because it greatly reduced American demand for Quebec exports. Between 1929 and 1932 the unemployment rate increased from 7.7% to 26.4%. In an attempt to remedy this, the Quebec government enacted infrastructure projects, campaigns to colonize distant regions (mostly in Abitibi-Témiscamingue and Bas-Saint-Laurent), financial assistance to farmers, and the  – the ancestor to Canada's Employment Insurance.

French Canadians remained opposed to conscription during the Second World War. When Canada declared war in September 1939, the federal government pledged not to conscript soldiers for overseas service. As the war went on, more and more English Canadians voiced support for conscription, despite firm opposition from French Canada. Following a 1942 poll that showed 72.9% of Quebec's residents were against conscription, while 80% or more were for conscription in every other province, the federal government passed Bill 80 for overseas service. Protests exploded and the Bloc Populaire emerged to fight conscription. The stark differences between the values of French and English Canada popularized the expression the "Two Solitudes".

He focused on defending provincial autonomy, Quebec's Catholic and francophone heritage, and laissez-faire liberalism instead of the emerging welfare state. However, as early as 1948, French Canadian society began to develop new ideologies and desires in response to significant societal changes such as new inventions like the television, the baby boom, workers' conflicts, electrification of the countryside, emergence of a middle class, the rural exodus and urbanization, expansion of universities and bureaucracies, creation of a motorway system, renaissance of literature and poetry, and others.

Modern Quebec (1960–present)

The Quiet Revolution was a period of intense modernization, secularization and social reform where, in a collective awakening, French Canadians clearly expressed their concern and dissatisfaction with their inferior socioeconomic position and the cultural assimilation of francophone minorities in the English-majority provinces. It resulted, among many other things, in the formation of the modern Québécois identity and Québécois nation. In 1960, the Liberal Party of Quebec was brought to power with a two-seat majority, having campaigned with the slogan "" ("It's time for things to change"). This government made many reforms in the fields of social policy, education, health and economic development. It created the Caisse de dépôt et placement du Québec, Labour Code, Ministry of Social Affairs, Ministry of Education, Office québécois de la langue française, Régie des rentes and Société générale de financement. In 1962, the government of Quebec dismantled the financial syndicates of Saint Jacques Street. The same year, Quebec began to nationalize its electricity. In order to buy out all the private electric companies and build new Hydro-Québec dams, Quebec was lent $300 million by the US in 1962, and $100 million by British Columbia in 1964. 

The Quiet Revolution was particularly characterized by the 1962 Liberal Party's slogan "" ("Masters in our own house"), which, to the Anglo-American conglomerates that dominated the economy and natural resources of Quebec, announced a collective will for freedom of the French-Canadian people. As a result of confrontations between the lower clergy and the laity, state institutions began to deliver services without the assistance of the church, and many parts of civil society began to be more secular. During the Second Vatican Council, the reform of Quebec's institutions was overseen and supported by the Holy See. In 1965, the Royal Commission on Bilingualism and Biculturalism wrote a preliminary report underlining Quebec's distinct character, and promoted open federalism, a political attitude guaranteeing Quebec to a minimum amount of consideration. To favour Quebec during its Quiet Revolution, Lester B. Pearson adopted a policy of open federalism. In 1966, the Union Nationale was re-elected and continued on with major reforms.

In 1967, President of France Charles de Gaulle visited Quebec, the first French head of state to do so, to attend Expo 67. There, he addressed a crowd of more than 100,000, making a speech ending with the exclamation: "" ("Long live free Quebec"). This declaration had a profound effect on Quebec by bolstering the burgeoning modern Quebec sovereignty movement and resulting in a political crisis between France and Canada. Following this, various civilian groups developed, sometimes confronting public authority, for example in the October Crisis of 1970. The meetings of the Estates General of French Canada in November 1967 marked a tipping point where relations between francophones of America, and especially francophones of Canada, ruptured. This breakdown greatly affected Quebec society's evolution.

In 1968, class conflicts and changes in mentalities intensified. That year, Option Quebec sparked a constitutional debate on the political future of the province by pitting federalist and sovereignist doctrines against each other. In 1973, the liberal government of Robert Bourassa initiated the James Bay Project on La Grande River. In 1974, it enacted the Official Language Act, which made French the official language of Quebec. In 1975, it established the Charter of Human Rights and Freedoms and the James Bay and Northern Quebec Agreement.

Quebec's first modern sovereignist government, led by René Lévesque, materialized when the Parti Québécois was brought to power in the 1976 Quebec general election. The Charter of the French Language came into force the following year, strengthening the linguistic rights of Quebecois. Between 1966 and 1969, the Estates General of French Canada confirmed the state of Quebec to be the nation's fundamental political milieu and for it to have the right to self-determination. In the 1980 referendum on sovereignty, 60% of the votes were against. After the referendum, Lévesque went back to Ottawa to start negotiating constitutional changes. On the night of November 4, 1981, the Kitchen Accord took place. Delegations from the other nine provinces and the federal government reached an agreement in the absence of Quebec's delegation, which had left for the night. Because of this, the National Assembly refused to recognize the new Constitution Act, 1982, which patriated the Canadian constitution and made numerous modifications to it. The 1982 amendments apply to Quebec despite Quebec never having consented to it.

Between 1982 and 1992, the Quebec government's attitude changed to prioritize reforming the federation. The subsequent attempts at constitutional amendments by the Mulroney and Bourassa governments ended in failure with both the Meech Lake Accord of 1987 and the Charlottetown Accord of 1992, resulting in the creation of the Bloc Québécois. In 1995, Jacques Parizeau called a referendum on Quebec's independence from Canada. This consultation ended in failure for sovereignists, though the outcome was very close: 50.6% "no" and 49.4% "yes". The Unity Rally, a controversial event paid for by sponsors outside Quebec, supporting the "no" side, took place on the eve of the referendum.

In 1998, following the Supreme Court of Canada's decision on the Reference Re Secession of Quebec, the Parliaments of Canada and Quebec defined the legal frameworks within which their respective governments would act in another referendum. On October 30, 2003, the National Assembly voted unanimously to affirm "that the people of Québec form a nation". On November 27, 2006, the House of Commons passed a symbolic motion declaring "that this House recognize that the Québécois form a nation within a united Canada." In March 2007, the Parti Québécois was pushed back to official opposition in the National Assembly, with the Liberal party leading. During the 2011 Canadian federal elections, Quebec voters rejected the Bloc Québécois in favour of the previously minor New Democratic Party (NDP). As the NDP's logo is orange, this was called the "orange wave". After three subsequent Liberal governments, the Parti Québécois regained power in 2012 and its leader, Pauline Marois, became the first female premier of Quebec. The Liberal Party of Quebec then returned to power in 2014. In 2018, the Coalition Avenir Québec won the provincial general elections. Between 2020 and 2021, Quebec took measures to protect itself against the COVID-19 pandemic.

Geography

Located in the eastern part of Canada, Quebec occupies a territory nearly three times the size of France or Texas. Most of Quebec is very sparsely populated. The most populous physiographic region is the Great Lakes–St. Lawrence Lowlands. The combination of rich soils and Quebec's relatively warm climate makes this valley the most prolific agricultural area of Quebec. The rural part of the landscape is divided into narrow rectangular tracts of land that extend from the river and date back to the seigneurial system.

Quebec's topography is very different from one region to another due to the varying composition of the ground, the climate, and the proximity to water. More than 95% of Quebec's territory, including the Labrador Peninsula, lies within the Canadian Shield. It is generally a quite flat and exposed mountainous terrain interspersed with higher points such as the Laurentian Mountains in southern Quebec, the Otish Mountains in central Quebec and the Torngat Mountains near Ungava Bay. While low and medium altitude peaks extend from western Quebec to the far north, high altitudes mountains emerge in the Capitale-Nationale region to the extreme east. In the Labrador Peninsula portion of the Shield, the far northern region of Nunavik includes the Ungava Peninsula and consists of flat Arctic tundra inhabited mostly by the Inuit. Further south is the Eastern Canadian Shield taiga ecoregion and the Central Canadian Shield forests. The Appalachian region has a narrow strip of ancient mountains along the southeastern border of Quebec.

Quebec has one of the world's largest reserves of fresh water, occupying 12% of its surface and representing 3% of the world's renewable fresh water. More than half a million lakes and 4,500 rivers empty into the Atlantic Ocean, through the Gulf of Saint Lawrence and the Arctic Ocean, by James, Hudson, and Ungava bays. The largest inland body of water is the Caniapiscau Reservoir; Lake Mistassini is the largest natural lake. The Saint Lawrence River has some of the world's largest sustaining inland Atlantic ports. Since 1959, the Saint Lawrence Seaway has provided a navigable link between the Atlantic Ocean and the Great Lakes.

The public lands of Quebec cover approximately 92% of the Québécois territory, including almost all of the bodies of water. Protected areas can be classified into about twenty different legal designations (ex. exceptional forest ecosystem, protected marine environment, national park, biodiversity reserve, wildlife reserve, zone d'exploitation contrôlée (ZEC), etc.). More than 2,500 sites in Quebec today are protected areas. As of 2013, protected areas comprise 9.14% of the Québécois territory.

Climate

In general, the climate of Quebec is cold and humid, with variations determined by latitude, maritime and elevation influences. During the summer, severe weather patterns (such as tornadoes and severe thunderstorms) occur occasionally.

Quebec is divided into four climatic zones: arctic, subarctic, humid continental and East maritime. In periods of intense heat and cold, temperatures can reach  in the summer and  during the Quebec winter, Most of central Quebec, ranging from 51 to 58 degrees North has a subarctic climate (Köppen Dfc). Winters are long, very cold, and snowy, and among the coldest in eastern Canada, while summers are warm but very short due to the higher latitude and the greater influence of Arctic air masses. Precipitation is also somewhat less than farther south, except at some of the higher elevations. The northern regions of Quebec have an arctic climate (Köppen ET), with very cold winters and short, much cooler summers. The primary influences in this region are the Arctic Ocean currents (such as the Labrador Current) and continental air masses from the High Arctic.

The all-time record of the greatest precipitation in winter was established in winter 2007–2008, with more than five metres of snow in the area of Quebec City. The winter of 2010 was the warmest and driest recorded in more than 60 years.

Flora and fauna

Given the geology of the province and its different climates, there are a number of large areas of vegetation in Quebec. These areas, listed in order from the northernmost to the southernmost are: the tundra, the taiga, the Canadian boreal forest (coniferous), mixed forest and deciduous forest. On the edge of Ungava Bay and Hudson Strait is the tundra, whose flora is limited to lichen with less than 50 growing days per year. Further south, the climate is conducive to the growth of the Canadian boreal forest, bounded on the north by the taiga. Not as arid as the tundra, the taiga is associated with the subarctic regions of the Canadian Shield and is characterized by a greater number of both plant (600) and animal (206) species. The taiga covers about 20% of the total area of Quebec. The Canadian boreal forest is the northernmost and most abundant of the three forest areas in Quebec that straddle the Canadian Shield and the upper lowlands of the province. Given a warmer climate, the diversity of organisms is also higher: there are about 850 plant species and 280 vertebrate species. The mixed forest is a transition zone between the Canadian boreal forest and deciduous forest. This area contains a diversity of plant (1000) and vertebrates (350) species, despite relatively cool temperatures. The ecozone mixed forest is characteristic of the Laurentians, the Appalachians and the eastern lowland forests. The third most northern forest area is characterized by deciduous forests. Because of its climate, this area has the greatest diversity of species, including more than 1600 vascular plants and 440 vertebrates.

From the Abitibi-Témiscamingue to the North Shore, the forest is composed primarily of conifers such as the Abies balsamea, the jack pine, the white spruce, the black spruce and the tamarack. The deciduous forest of the Great Lakes–St. Lawrence Lowlands is mostly composed of deciduous species such as the sugar maple, the red maple, the white ash, the American beech, the butternut (white walnut), the American elm, the basswood, the bitternut hickory and the northern red oak as well as some conifers such as the eastern white pine and the northern whitecedar. The distribution areas of the paper birch, the trembling aspen and the mountain ash cover more than half of Quebec's territory.

Biodiversity of the estuary and gulf of Saint Lawrence River includes aquatic mammal wildlife, such as the blue whale, the beluga, the minke whale and the harp seal (earless seal). The Nordic marine animals include the walrus and the narwhal. Inland waters are populated by small to large freshwater fish, such as the largemouth bass, the American pickerel, the walleye, the Acipenser oxyrinchus, the muskellunge, the Atlantic cod, the Arctic char, the brook trout, the Microgadus tomcod (tomcod), the Atlantic salmon, and the rainbow trout.

Among the birds commonly seen in the southern part of Quebec are the American robin, the house sparrow, the red-winged blackbird, the mallard, the common grackle, the blue jay, the American crow, the black-capped chickadee, some warblers and swallows, the starling and the rock pigeon. Avian fauna includes birds of prey like the golden eagle, the peregrine falcon, the snowy owl and the bald eagle. Sea and semi-aquatic birds seen in Quebec are mostly the Canada goose, the double-crested cormorant, the northern gannet, the European herring gull, the great blue heron, the sandhill crane, the Atlantic puffin and the common loon.

The large land wildlife includes the white-tailed deer, the moose, the muskox, the caribou (reindeer), the American black bear and the polar bear. The medium-sized land wildlife includes the cougar, the coyote, the eastern wolf, the bobcat, the Arctic fox, the fox, etc. The small animals seen most commonly include the eastern grey squirrel, the snowshoe hare, the groundhog, the skunk, the raccoon, the chipmunk and the Canadian beaver.

Government and politics

Quebec is founded on the Westminster system, and is both a liberal democracy and a constitutional monarchy with parliamentary regime. The head of government in Quebec is the premier (called  in French), who leads the largest party in the unicameral National Assembly from which the Executive Council of Quebec is appointed. The lieutenant governor represents the King of Canada and acts as the province's head of state.

Quebec has 78 members of Parliament (MPs) in the House of Commons of Canada. They are elected in federal elections. At the level of the Senate of Canada, Quebec is represented by 24 senators, which are appointed on the advice of the prime minister of Canada. Quebec has a network of three offices for representing itself and defending its interests in Canada; these offices' mandate is to ensure an institutional presence of the Government of Quebec near other Canadian governments and to allow Quebec to interact effectively with the other provinces of the country.

The Quebec State holds administrative and police authority in the areas of exclusive jurisdiction. The Conseil du trésor supports the ministers of the Executive Council in their function of stewardship of the state. The Parliament of the 40th legislature is made up of the following parties: Coalition Avenir Québec (CAQ), Parti libéral du Québec (PLQ), Québec solidaire (QS) and Parti Québécois (PQ), as well as an independent member. There are 22 official political parties in Quebec.

Subdivisions

Quebec's territory is divided into 17 administrative regions as follows:

Bas-Saint-Laurent
Saguenay–Lac-Saint-Jean
Capitale-Nationale
Mauricie
Estrie
Montréal
Outaouais
Abitibi-Témiscamingue
Côte-Nord
Nord-du-Québec
Gaspésie–Îles-de-la-Madeleine
Chaudière-Appalaches
Laval
Lanaudière
Laurentides
Montérégie
Centre-du-Québec

The province also has the following divisions:
4 territories (Abitibi, Ashuanipi, Mistassini and Nunavik) which group together the lands that once formed the District of Ungava
36 judicial districts
73 
125 

For municipal purposes, Quebec is composed of:
1,117 local municipalities of various types:
11 agglomerations grouping 42 of these local municipalities
45 boroughs within 8 of these local municipalities
89 regional county municipalities or RCMs
2 metropolitan communities
the regional Kativik administration
the unorganised territories

Public policies
Other notable examples include the Charter of Human Rights and Freedoms, the Charter of the French language, and the Civil Code of Quebec. Since 1969, the Official Languages Act has guaranteed a legal and linguistic context conducive to the development of the province.

While Quebec's Ministry of International Relations coordinates international policy, its Quebec's general delegations are the main interlocutors in foreign countries. Under the rule of law, any agreement made abroad, by the federal or Quebecois government, is only applicable in domestic politics by the consent of popular sovereignty. Quebec is the only Canadian province that has set up a ministry to exclusively embody the state's powers for international relations.

Since 2006, Quebec has adopted a green plan to meet the objectives of the Kyoto Protocol regarding climate change. The Ministry of Sustainable Development, Environment, and Fight Against Climate Change (MELCC) is the primary entity responsible for the application of environmental policy. The Société des établissements de plein air du Québec (SEPAQ) is the main body responsible for the management of national parks and wildlife reserves. On November 23, 2009, Jean Charest announced Quebec's greenhouse gas reduction targets at the Copenhagen conference: Quebec intended to reduce its emissions by 20% by 2020 (compared to the emissions of 1990) and focus on the transportation sector, which accounts for 40% of GHG emissions in Quebec. Nearly 500,000 people took part in a climate protest on the streets of Montreal in 2019.

Agriculture in Quebec has been subject to agricultural zoning regulations since 1978. Faced with the problem of expanding urban sprawl, agricultural zones were created to ensure the protection of fertile land, which make up 2% of Quebec's total area.  are essentially public property. The Union des producteurs agricoles (UPA) seeks to protect the interests of its members, including forestry workers, and works jointly with the Ministry of Agriculture, Fisheries and Food (MAPAQ) and the Ministry of Energy and Natural Resources.

The  has the mandate to oversee social and workforce developments through Emploi-Québec and its local employment centers (CLE). The  (CNESST) is the main body responsible for the application of labour laws in Quebec and enforcing the collective agreements concluded between unions of employees and their employers.

When it comes to taxation, Revenu Québec takes the majority of its revenue through a progressive income tax, a 9.975% sales tax and various other taxes (such as carbon, corporate and capital gains taxes), equalization payments from the federal government, transfer payments from other provinces and direct payments. By some measures Quebec is the most taxed province; a 2012 study indicated that "Quebec companies pay 26 per cent more in taxes than the Canadian average". A 2014 report by the Fraser Institute indicated that "relative to its size, Quebec is the most indebted province in Canada by a wide margin".

Immigration to Quebec is supported by integration programs favouring French, as it is the common language, as well as the principles of pluralism and interculturalism. The  is responsible for the selection and integration of immigrants. Quebec's health and social services network is administered by the Ministry of Health and Social Services. It is composed of 95  (RLS; 'local service networks') and 18  (ASSS; 'health and social services agencies'). Quebec's health system is supported by the Régie de l'assurance maladie du Québec (RAMQ) which works to maintain the accessibility of services for all citizens of Quebec.

The  (CPEs; 'centres for young children') are institutions that link family policies to education. In 2012, the annual cost for postsecondary tuition was CA$2,168 (€1,700)—less than half of Canada's average tuition. Part of the reason for this is the relative democratization of higher education implemented during the Quiet Revolution, when the Quebec government froze tuition fees to a relatively low level and created CEGEPs. When Jean Charest's government decided in 2012 to sharply increase university fees, students protests erupted. Because of these protests, Quebec's tuition fees remain relatively low.

External relationships
International relationships-wise, Quebec's closest partner is the United States, with which it has a long history of economic relations and military-related interactions; 87% of Quebec's international exports head to the United States, and Quebec has several economic and military pacts with the U.S. like NAFTA and NORAD. Products of American culture like songs, movies, fashion and food strongly affect Québécois culture.

Quebec has a historied relationship with France as it was a part of the French Empire and both regions share a language. The  and the francophonie are a few of the tools used for relations between Quebec and France. In Paris, a place du Québec was inaugurated in 1980. Quebec also has a historied relationship with the United Kingdom, having been a part of the British Empire. Quebec and the UK currently share the same head of state.

Quebec has a network of 32 offices in 18 countries. These offices serve the purpose of representing Quebec in the country in which they are situated and are overseen by Quebec's Ministry of International Relations. Quebec, like other Canadian provinces, also maintains representatives in some Canadian embassies and consulates general. As of 2019, the Government of Quebec has delegates-general (agents-general) in Brussels, London, Mexico City, Munich, New York City, Paris and Tokyo; delegates to Atlanta, Boston, Chicago, Houston, Los Angeles, and Rome; and offices headed by directors offering more limited services in Barcelona, Beijing, Dakar, Hong Kong, Mumbai, São Paulo, Shanghai, Stockholm, and Washington. In addition, there are the equivalent of honorary consuls, titled antennes, in Berlin, Philadelphia, Qingdao, Seoul, and Silicon Valley.

Quebec also has a representative to UNESCO and participates in the Organization of American States. Quebec is a member of the Assemblée parlementaire de la Francophonie and of the Organisation internationale de la francophonie.

Law

Quebec law is the shared responsibility of the federal and provincial government. The federal government is responsible for criminal law, foreign affairs and laws relating to the regulation of Canadian commerce, interprovincial transportation, and telecommunications. The provincial government is responsible for private law, the administration of justice, and several social domains, such as social assistance, healthcare, education, and natural resources.

Quebec law is influenced by two judicial traditions (civil law and common law) and four classic sources of law (legislation, case law, doctrine and customary law). Private law in Quebec affects all relationships between individuals (natural or juridical persons) and is largely under the jurisdiction of the Parliament of Quebec. The Parliament of Canada also influences Quebec private law, in particular through its power over banks, bankruptcy, marriage, divorce and maritime law. The  is the primary component of Quebec's private law and is codified in the Civil Code of Quebec. Public law in Quebec is largely derived from the common law tradition. Quebec constitutional law governs the rules surrounding the Quebec government, the Parliament of Quebec and Quebec's courts. Quebec administrative law governs relations between individuals and the Quebec public administration. Quebec also has some limited jurisdiction over criminal law. Finally, Quebec, like the federal government, has tax law power. Certain portions of Quebec law are considered mixed. This is the case, for example, with human rights and freedoms which are governed by the Quebec Charter of Human Rights and Freedoms, a Charter which applies to both government and citizens.

English is not an official language in Quebec law. However, both English and French are required by the Constitution Act, 1867 for the enactment of laws and regulations, and any person may use English or French in the National Assembly and the courts. The books and records of the National Assembly must also be kept in both languages.

Courts
Although Quebec is a civil law jurisdiction, it does not follow the pattern of other civil law systems which have court systems divided by subject matter. Instead, the court system follows the English model of unitary courts of general jurisdiction. The provincial courts have jurisdiction to decide matters under provincial law as well as federal law, including civil, criminal and constitutional matters. The major exception to the principle of general jurisdiction is that the Federal Court and Federal Court of Appeal have exclusive jurisdiction over some areas of federal law, such as review of federal administrative bodies, federal taxes, and matters relating to national security.

The Quebec courts are organized in a pyramid. At the bottom, there are the municipal courts, the Professions Tribunal, the Human Rights Tribunal, and administrative tribunals. Decisions of those bodies can be reviewed by the two trial courts, the Court of Quebec the Superior Court of Quebec. The Court of Quebec is the main criminal trial court, and also a court for small civil claims. The Superior Court is a trial court of general jurisdiction, in both criminal and civil matters. The decisions of those courts can be appealed to the Quebec Court of Appeal. Finally, if the case is of great importance, it may be appealed to the Supreme Court of Canada.

The Court of Appeal serves two purposes. First, it is the general court of appeal for all legal issues from the lower courts. It hears appeals from the trial decisions of the Superior Court and the Quebec Court. It also can hear appeals from decisions rendered by those two courts on appeals or judicial review matters relating to the municipal courts and administrative tribunals. Second, but much more rarely, the Court of Appeal possesses the power to respond to reference questions posed to it by the Quebec Cabinet. The Court of Appeal renders more than 1,500 judgments per year.

Law enforcement
The Sûreté du Québec is the main police force of Quebec. The Sûreté du Québec can also serve a support and coordination role with other police forces, such as with municipal police forces or with the Royal Canadian Mounted Police (RCMP). The RCMP has the power to enforce certain federal laws in Quebec. However, given the existence of the Sûreté du Québec, its role is more limited than in the other provinces.

Municipal police, such as the Service de police de la Ville de Montréal and the Service de police de la Ville de Québec, are responsible for law enforcement in their municipalities. The Sûreté du Québec fulfills the role of municipal police in the 1038 municipalities that do not have a municipal police force. The Indigenous communities of Quebec have their own police forces.

For offences against provincial or federal laws in Quebec (including the Criminal Code), the Director of Criminal and Penal Prosecutions is responsible for prosecuting offenders in court through Crown attorneys. The Department of Justice of Canada also has the power to prosecute offenders, but only for offences against specific federal laws (ex. selling narcotics). Quebec is responsible for operating the prison system for sentences of less than two years, and the federal government operates penitentiaries for sentences of two years or more.

Demographics

In the 2016 census, Quebec had a population of 8,164,361, a 3.3% increase from its 2011 population of 7,903,001. Quebec accounts for a little under 23% of the Canadian population. The most populated cities in Quebec are Montreal (1,762,976), Quebec City (538,738), Laval (431,208), and Gatineau (281,501).

In 2016, Quebec's median age was 41.2 years. As of 2020, 20.8% of Québécois were less than 20, 59.5% were aged between 20 and 64, and 19.7% were 65 or older. In 2019, Quebec witnessed an increase in the number of births compared to the year before (84,200 vs 83,840) and had a total fertility rate of about 1.6 children born per woman. As of 2020, the average Québécois lifespan was 82.3 years. Quebec in 2019 registered the highest rate of population growth since 1972, with an increase of 110,000 people, mostly because of the arrival of a high number of immigrants. As of 2019, most international immigrants came from China, India or France. In 2016, three out of 10 Québécois possessed a postsecondary degree or diploma. Most residents, particularly couples, are property owners. In 2016, 80% of both property owners and renters considered their housing to be "unaffordable".

In 2016, the North American Aboriginal population of Quebec numbered 359,430, being composed of 17,175 Inuit, 289,610 First Nations people, and 61,260 Métis. There is an undercount, as some Indian bands regularly refuse to participate in Canadian censuses. In 2016, the Mohawk reserves of Kahnawake and Doncaster 17 along with the Indian settlement of Kanesatake and Lac-Rapide, a reserve of the Algonquins of Barriere Lake, were not counted. Almost 9% of the population of Quebec belongs to a visible minority group. Most visible minorities in Quebec live in or near Montreal.

Religion

According to the 2021 census, the most commonly cited religions in Quebec were:
Christianity (5,385,240 residents, or 64.8%)
Irreligion (2,267,720 or 27.3%)
Islam (421,710 or 5.1%)
Judaism (84,530 or 1.0%)
Buddhism (48,365 or 0.6%)
Hinduism (47,390 or 0.6%)
Sikhism (23,345 or 0.3%)
Indigenous spirituality (3,790 or <0.1%)
Other (26,385 or 0.3%)

The Roman Catholic Church has long occupied a central and integral place in Quebec society since the foundation of Quebec City in 1608. However, since the Quiet Revolution, which secularized Quebec, irreligion has been growing significantly. 

The oldest parish church in North America is the Cathedral-Basilica of Notre-Dame de Québec. Its construction began in 1647, when it was known under the name Notre-Dame-de-la-Paix, and it was finished in 1664. The most frequented place of worship in Quebec is the Basilica of Sainte-Anne-de-Beaupré. This basilica welcomes millions of visitors each year. Saint Joseph's Oratory is the largest place of worship in the world dedicated to Saint Joseph. Many pilgrimages include places such as Saint Benedict Abbey, Notre-Dame de Montréal Basilica, Marie-Reine-du-Monde de Montréal Basilica-Cathedral, Saint-Michel Basilica-Cathedral, and Saint-Patrick's Basilica. Another important place of worship in Quebec is the Anglican Holy Trinity Cathedral, which was erected between 1800 and 1804. It was the first Anglican cathedral built outside the British Isles.

Language

As of the 2021 Canadian Census, the ten most spoken languages in the province were French (spoken by 7,786,735 people, or 93.72% of the population), English (4,317,180 or 51.96%), Spanish (453,905 or 5.46%), Arabic (343,675 or 4.14%), Italian (168,040 or 2.02%), Haitian Creole (118,010 or 1.42%), Mandarin (80,520 or 0.97%), Portuguese (65,605 or 0.8%), Russian (55,485 or 0.7%), and Greek (50,375 or 0.6%). The question on knowledge of languages allows for multiple responses.

Quebec differs from other Canadian provinces in that French is the only official and preponderant language, while English predominates in the rest of Canada. French is the common language, understood and spoken by 94% of the population. Quebec is the only Canadian province whose population is mainly Francophone; 6,102,210 people (78.1% of the population) recorded it as their sole native language in the 2011 Census, and 6,249,085 (80.0%) recorded that they spoke it most often at home. Knowledge of French is widespread even among those who do not speak it natively; in 2011, about 94.4% of the total population reported being able to speak French, alone or in combination with other languages. A considerable number of Quebec residents consider themselves to be bilingual in French and English: about 42.6% of the population (3,328,725 people) report knowing both languages, the highest proportion of any Canadian province.

Québécois French is the most widely used variant of the language spoken in the province. The Office québécois de la langue française oversees the application of the linguistic policy on the territory jointly with the Superior Council of the French Language and the Commission de toponymie du Québec. Through its linguistic recommendations, the GDT fights against the invasion of Frenglish into the French language. Canada is estimated to be home to between 32 and 36 regional French accents, 17 of which can be found in Quebec. There are also people in Quebec who will naturally speak using Standard Québécois or Joual, both of which are considered sociolects rather than regional accents.

The Gendron Commission report of 1968 established the foundations for the white book of the government of Quebec' linguistic policy. Dependent on commissions of inquiry, this policy statement is also accompanied the Charter of the French language ("Bill 101") since 1977. As French's demographic weight continues to decline, Quebec faces the threat of assimilation. Several institutions seek to protect and promote French such as the Office québécois de la langue française, the Superior Council of the French Language, and the Commission de toponymie du Québec.

As of 2011, English is the mother tongue of nearly 650,000 Quebecers (8% of the population). These anglophones, sometimes called Anglo-Québécois, constitute the second largest linguistic group in Quebec. In addition, in 2001, roughly 50,000 people (0.7% of the population) considered their mother tongue to be both French and English. Anglo-Quebecers reside mainly in the west of the island of Montreal (West Island), downtown Montreal and the Pontiac.

Three families of Indigenous languages encompassing eleven languages exist in Quebec: the Algonquian language family (Abenaki, Algonquin, Maliseet-passamaquoddy, Mi'kmaq, and the linguistic continuum of Atikamekw, Cree, Innu-aimun, and Naskapi), the Inuit–Aleut language family (Nunavimmiutitut, an Inuktitut dialect spoken by the Inuit of Nord-du-Québec), and the Iroquoian language family (Mohawk and Wendat). In the 2016 census, 50,895 people in Quebec said they knew at least one Indigenous language. Furthermore, 45,570 people declared having an Indigenous language as their mother tongue. In Quebec, most Indigenous languages are transmitted quite well from one generation to the next with a mother tongue retention rate of 92%.

As of the 2016 census, the most common immigrant languages are Arabic (2.5% of the total population), Spanish (1.9%), Italian (1.4%), Creole languages (mainly Haitian Creole) (0.8%) and Mandarin (0.6%).

Aboriginals

In 2016, the North American Aboriginal population of Quebec numbered 359,430 people, being composed of 17,175 Inuit, 289,610 First Nations people and 61,260 Métis. The Inuit of Quebec live mainly in Nunavik in Nord-du-Québec. They make up the majority of the population living north of the 55th parallel. There are ten First Nations ethnic groups in Quebec: the Abenaki, the Algonquin, the Attikamek, the Cree, the Wolastoqiyik, the Mi'kmaq, the Innu, the Naskapis, the Huron-Wendat and the Mohawks. The Mohawks were once part of the Iroquois Confederacy.

Aboriginal rights were enunciated in the Indian Act and adopted at the end of the 19th century. This act confines First Nations within the reserves created for them. The Indian Act is still in effect today. In 1975, the Cree, Inuit and the Quebec government agreed to an agreement called the James Bay and Northern Quebec Agreement that would extended indigenous rights beyond reserves, and to over two-thirds of the Québécois territory. Because this extension was enacted without the participation of the federal government, the extended indigenous rights only exist in Quebec. In 1978, the Naskapis joined the agreement when the Northeastern Quebec Agreement was signed. Discussions have been underway with the Montagnais of the Côte-Nord and Saguenay–Lac-Saint-Jean for the potential creation of a similar autonomy in two new distinct territories that would be called Innu Assi and Nitassinan.

A few political institutions have also been created over time:
 The Assembly of First Nations Quebec-Labrador
 The Grand Council of the Crees
 The Makivik Corporation

Acadians
Furthermore, more than a million Québécois wear a patronym of Acadian origin.

Quebec houses an Acadian community spread out across several regions. Acadians mainly live on the Magdalen Islands and in Gaspesia, but about thirty other communities are present elsewhere in Quebec, mostly in the Côte-Nord and Centre-du-Québec regions. An Acadian community in Quebec can be called a "Cadie" or "Petite Cadie", and some cities and villages use the demonym "Cadien".

Economy

Quebec has an advanced, market-based, and open economy. In 2009, its gross domestic product (GDP) of US$32,408 per capita at purchasing power parity remains lower than the Canadian average of US$37,830 per capita. The economy of Quebec is ranked the 37th largest economy in the world just behind Greece and 28th for the GDP per capita. The economy of Quebec represents 20.36% of the total GDP of Canada. The provincial debt-to-GDP ratio peaked at 50.7% in 2012–2013, and is projected to decline to 33.8% in 2023–2024.

Like most industrialized countries, the economy of Quebec is based mainly on the services sector. Quebec's economy has traditionally been fuelled by abundant natural resources and a well-developed infrastructure, but has undergone significant change over the past decade. Firmly grounded in the knowledge economy, Quebec has one of the highest growth rates of GDP in Canada. The knowledge sector represents about 30.9% of Quebec's GDP. In 2011, Quebec experienced faster growth of its research-and-development (R&D) spending than other Canadian provinces. Quebec's spending in R&D in 2011 was equal to 2.63% of GDP, above the European Union average of 1.84% and will have to reaches the target of devoting 3% of GDP to research and development activities in 2013 according to the Lisbon Strategy. The percentage spent on research and technology is the highest in Canada and higher than the averages for the Organisation for Economic Co-operation and Development and the G7 countries.

Some of the most important national Québécois companies include: Bombardier, Desjardins, the National Bank of Canada, the Jean Coutu Group, Transcontinental média, Quebecor, the Métro Inc. food retailers, Hydro-Québec, the Société des alcools du Québec, the Bank of Montreal, Saputo, the Cirque du Soleil, the Caisse de dépôt et placement du Québec, the Normandin restaurants, and Vidéotron.

Exports and imports

Thanks to the World Trade Organization (WTO) and the North American Free Trade Agreement (NAFTA), Quebec was, experiencing an increase in its ability to compete on the international market. The province saw its exports increase significantly. NAFTA is especially advantageous as it gives Quebec, among other things, access to a market of 130 million consumers within a radius of 1,000 kilometres. These international exchanges contribute to the strength of the Quebec economy, most particularly in terms of employment.  about 60% of exports are made to outside of Canada.

In 2008, Québécois exports to other provinces in Canada and abroad totalled 157.3 billion CND$, or 51.8% of Quebec's gross domestic product (GDP). Of this total, 60.4% were international exports, and 39.6% were interprovincial exports. The breakdown by destination of international merchandise exports is: United States (72.2%), Europe (14.4%), Asia (5.1%), Middle East (2.7%), Central America (2.3%), South America (1.9%), Africa (0.8%) and Oceania (0.7%). Quebec's main economic partner remains the rest of Canada.

In 2008, Quebec imported $178 billion worth of goods and services, or 58.6% of its GDP. Of this total, 62.9% of goods were imported from international markets, while 37.1% of goods were interprovincial imports. The breakdown by origin of international merchandise imports is as follows: United States (31.1%), Europe (28.7%), Asia (17.1%), Africa (11.7%), South America (4.5%), Central America (3.7%), Middle East (1.3%) and Oceania (0.7%).

Primary sector

Quebec produces most of Canada's hydroelectricity and is the second biggest hydroelectricity producer in the world (2019). Because of this, Quebec has been described as a potential clean energy superpower. In 2019, Quebec's electricity production amounted to 214 terawatt-hours (TWh), 95% of which comes from hydroelectric power stations, and 4.7% of which come from wind energy. The public company Hydro-Québec occupies a dominant position in the production, transmission and distribution of electricity in Quebec. Hydro-Québec operates 63 hydroelectric power stations and 28 large reservoirs. Because of the remoteness of Hydro-Québec's TransÉnergie division, it operates the largest electricity transmission network in North America. Quebec stands out for its use of renewable energy. In 2008, electricity (more than 99% of which came from renewable energy sources) ranked as the main form of energy used in Quebec (41.6%), followed by oil (38.2%) and natural gas (10.7%). By 2017, 47% of all energy came from renewable sources. The Québécois government's energy policy seeks to build, by 2030, a low carbon economy. The policy aims in particular to reduce the quantity of petroleum products consumed by 40%, increase renewable energy production by 25%, and increase the production of bioenergy by 50%.

Quebec ranks among the top ten areas to do business in mining in the world. In 2011, the mining industry accounted for 6.3% of Quebec's GDP and it employed about 50,000 people in 158 companies. It has around 30 mines, 158 exploration companies and 15 primary processing industries. While many metallic and industrial minerals are exploited, the main ones are gold, iron, copper and zinc. Others include: titanium, asbestos, silver, magnesium and nickel, among many others. Quebec is also as a major source of diamonds. Since 2002, Quebec has seen an increase in its mineral explorations. In 2003, the value of mineral exploitation reached $3.7 billion.

The agri-food industry plays an important role in the economy of Quebec, with meat and dairy products being the two main sectors. It accounts for 8% of the Quebec's GDP and generate $19.2 billion. In 2010, this industry generated 487,000 jobs in agriculture, fisheries, manufacturing of food, beverages and tobacco and food distribution.

Secondary sector

In 2021, Quebec's aerospace industry employed 35,000 people and its sales totalled C$15.2 billion. Many aerospace companies are active here, including CMC Electronics, Bombardier, Pratt & Whitney Canada, Héroux-Devtek, Rolls-Royce, General Electric, Bell Textron, L3Harris, Safran, SONACA, CAE Inc., and Airbus, among others. Montreal is globally considered one of the aerospace industry's great centres, and several international aviation organisations seat here. Both Aéro Montréal and the CRIAQ were created to assist aerospace companies.

The pulp and paper industry industry accounted for 3.1% of Quebec's GDP in 2007  and generated annual shipments valued at more than $14 billion. This industry employs 68,000 people in several regions of Quebec. It is also the main -and in some circumstances only- source of manufacturing activity in more than 250 municipalities in the province. The forest industry has slowed in recent years because of the softwood lumber dispute. In 2020, this industry represented 8% of Quebec's exports.

As Quebec has few significant deposits of fossil fuels, all hydrocarbons are imported. Refiners' sourcing strategies have varied over time and have depended on market conditions. In the 1990s, Quebec purchased much of its oil from the North Sea. Since 2015, it now consumes almost exclusively the crude produced in western Canada and the United States. Quebec's two active refineries have a total capacity of 402,000 barrels per day, greater than local needs which stood at 365,000 barrels per day in 2018.

Thanks to hydroelectricity, Quebec is the world's fourth largest aluminum producer and creates 90% of Canadian aluminum. Three companies make aluminum here: Rio Tinto, Alcoa and Aluminium Alouette. Their 9 alumineries produce 2,9 million tons of aluminum annually and employ 30,000 workers.

Tertiary sector
The finance and insurance sector employs more than 168,000 people. Of this number, 78,000 are employed by the banking sector, 53,000 by the insurance sector and 20,000 by the securities and investment sector. The Bank of Montreal, founded in 1817 in Montreal, was Quebec's first bank but, like many other large banks, its central branch is now in Toronto. Several banks remain under Quebecois control, including the National Bank of Canada, the Desjardins Group and the Laurentian Bank.

The tourism industry is a major sector in Quebec. The Ministry of Tourism ensures the development of this industry under the commercial name "Bonjour Québec". Quebec is the second most important province for tourism in Canada, receiving 21.5% of tourists' spending (2021). The industry provides employment to over 400,000 people. These employees work in the more than 29,000 tourism-related businesses in Quebec, most of which are restaurants or hotels. 70% of tourism-related businesses are located in or close to Montreal or Quebec City. It is estimated that, in 2010, Quebec welcomed 25.8 million tourists. Of these, 76.1% came from Quebec, 12.2% from the rest of Canada, 7.7% from the United States and 4.1% from other countries. Annually, tourists spend more than $6.7 billion in Quebec's tourism industry.

Quebec's IT sector has 7,600 businesses and employs 140,000 people. Its most developed sectors are telecommunications, multimedia and video game software, computer services, microelectronics, and the components sector. There are currently 115 telecommunications companies established in the province, including Motorola, Ericsson and Mitec. The multimedia and video game sector has been growing fast since the early 2000s. The Digital Alliance, which claims 191 active members in video games, online education, mobility and Internet services, estimates the annual revenue of the sector at $827 million in 2014. The microelectronics sector is made up of more than 100 companies employing 13,000 people. Computer services, software development, and consulting engineering employ 60,000 skilled workers. While the largest IT employers are CMC Electronics, IBM, and Matrox, many other tech companies are present here, including Ubisoft, Electronic Arts, Microids, Strategy First, Eidos, Activision, A2M, Frima Studio, etc.

Approximately 1.1 million Quebecers work in the field of science and technology. In 2007, the Government of Quebec launched the Stratégie québécoise de la recherche et de l'innovation (SQRI) aiming to promote development through research, science and technology. The government hoped to create a strong culture of innovation in Quebec for the next decades and to create a sustainable economy.

Quebec is considered one of world leaders in fundamental scientific research, having produced ten Nobel laureates in either physics, chemistry, or medicine. It is also considered one of the world leaders in sectors such as aerospace, information technology, biotechnology and pharmaceuticals, and therefore plays a significant role in the world's scientific and technological communities. Between 2000 and 2011, Quebec had over 9,469 scientific publications in biomedical research and engineering. The contribution of Quebec in science and technology represented approximately 1% of the research worldwide between the 1980s and 2009.

The province is one of the world leaders in the field of space science and contributed to important discoveries in this field. One of the most recent is the discovery of the complex extrasolar planets system HR 8799. HR 8799 is the first direct observation of an exoplanet in history. The Canadian Space Agency was established in Quebec due to its major role in this research field. A total of four Quebecers have been in space since the creation of the CSA: Marc Garneau, Julie Payette, and David Saint-Jacques as CSA astronauts, plus Guy Laliberté as a private citizen who paid for his trip. Quebec has also contributed to the creation of some Canadian artificial satellites including SCISAT-1, ISIS, Radarsat-1 and Radarsat-2.

Quebec ranks among the world leaders in the field of life science. William Osler, Wilder Penfield, Donald Hebb, Brenda Milner, and others made significant discoveries in medicine, neuroscience and psychology while working at McGill University in Montreal. Quebec has more than 450 biotechnology and pharmaceutical companies which together employ more than 25,000 people and 10,000 highly qualified researchers. Montreal is ranked fourth in North America for the number of jobs in the pharmaceutical sector.

Education

The education system of Quebec, administered by the government of Quebec's Ministry of Education and Higher Education, differs from those of other Canadian provinces. The province has five levels of education: first ; then CEGEP (see College education in Quebec); and finally . Attached to these levels are the options to also attend professional development opportunities, classes for adults, and continuing education. For every level of teaching, there exists a public network and private network: the public network is financed by taxes while the private options must be paid for by the student. In 2020, school boards were replaced by school service centres.

All universities in Quebec exist by virtue of laws adopted by the National Assembly of Quebec in 1967 during the Quiet Revolution. Their financing mostly comes from public taxes, but the laws under which they operate grants them more autonomy than other levels of education.

Infrastructure

Transportation

Development and security of land transportation in Canada are provided by Transports Québec. Other organizations, such as the Canadian Coast Guard and Nav Canada, provide the same service for the sea and air transportation. The Commission des transports du Québec works with the freight carriers and the public transport.

In addition, Quebec has almost 12,000 bridges, tunnels, retaining walls, culverts and other structures such as the Quebec Bridge, the Laviolette Bridge and the Louis-Hippolyte Lafontaine Bridge–Tunnel.

In the waters of the Saint Lawrence there are eight deep-water ports for the transhipment of goods. In 2003, 3886 cargo and 9.7 million tonnes of goods transited the Quebec portion of the Saint Lawrence Seaway.

Concerning rail transport, Quebec has  of railways integrated in the large North American network. Although primarily intended for the transport of goods through companies such as the Canadian National (CN) and the Canadian Pacific (CP), the Quebec railway network is also used by inter-city passengers via Via Rail Canada and Amtrak. In April 2012, plans were unveiled for the construction of an  railway running north from Sept-Îles, to support mining and other resource extraction in the Labrador Trough.

Quebec's air network includes 43 airports that offer scheduled services on a daily basis. In addition, the Government of Quebec owns airports and heliports to increase the accessibility of local services to communities in the Basse-Côte-Nord and northern regions.

Various other transport networks crisscross the province of Quebec, including hiking trails, snowmobile trails and bike paths.

Healthcare
Québécois public health pursues a health policy that emphasizes prevention, is based on the analysis of health-related data, and evolves with the needs of the population. Like in other nations, the public health policies implemented in Québécois society have enabled Québécois to considerably extend their life expectancy since the mid-20th century.

Health and social services are part of the same administration. The Quebec health system is also public, which means that the state acts as the main insurer and administrator, that funding is provided by general taxation, and that patients have access to care regardless of their income level.

They ensure the distribution of different services on the territories they are assigned to. Quebec has approximately 140 hospitals for general or specialised care (CHSGS). Quebec also has other types of establishments in its healthcare system, such as Centre local de services communautaires (CLSC), Centre d'hébergement et de soins de longue durée (CHSLD), Centre de réadaptation and Centre de protection de l'enfance et de la jeunesse. Finally, there are private healthcare establishments (paid for directly by the patient) like , pharmacies, private clinics, dentists, community organisations and retirement homes.

A 2021 Ipsos poll found that 85% of Quebecers agree that their health care system is too bureaucratic to respond to the needs of the population.

Culture

Quebec has developed its own unique culture from its historic New France roots. Its culture also symbolizes a distinct perspective: being a French-speaking nation surrounded by a bigger English-speaking culture. The culture has also been influenced by First Nations, the British, Americans, other French-speaking North Americans like the Acadians and Franco-Ontarians, English-speaking Canadians and some immigrants.

The Quartier Latin (English: Latin Quarter) of Montreal, and Vieux-Québec (English: Old Quebec) in Quebec City are two hubs of cultural activity. Life in the cafés and "terrasses" (outdoor restaurant terraces) reveals a Latin influence in Quebec's culture, with the théâtre Saint-Denis in Montreal and the Capitole de Québec theatre in Quebec City being among the principal attractions.

A number of governmental and non-government organizations support cultural activity in Quebec. The Conseil des arts et des lettres du Québec (CALQ) is an initiative of the Ministry of Culture and Communications (Quebec). It supports creation, innovation, production, and international exhibits for all cultural fields of Quebec. The Société de développement des entreprises culturelles (SODEC) works to promote and fund individuals working in the cultural industry. The Prix du Québec is an award given by the government to confer the highest distinction and honour to individuals demonstrating exceptional achievement in their respective cultural field. Other Québécois awards include the Athanase David Awards (Literature), Félix Awards (Music), Gémeaux Awards (Television and film), Jutra Awards (Cinema), Masques Awards (Theatre), Olivier Guimond Awards (Humour) and the Opus Awards (Concert music).

Performing arts

Traditional music is imbued with many dances, such as the jig, the quadrille, the reel and line dancing. Traditional instruments include harmonica, fiddle, spoons, jaw harp and accordion. The First Nations and the Inuit of Quebec also have their own traditional music. Quebec's most popular artists of the last century include the singers Félix Leclerc, Gilles Vigneault, Kate and Anna McGarrigle and Céline Dion. The Association québécoise de l'industrie du disque, du spectacle et de la vidéo (ADISQ) was created in 1978 to promote the music industry in Quebec. The Orchestre symphonique de Québec and the Orchestre symphonique de Montréal are respectively associated with the Opéra de Québec and the Opéra de Montreal whose performances are presented at the Grand Théâtre de Québec and at Place des Arts. The Ballets Jazz de Montreal, the Grands Ballets and La La La Human Steps are three important professional troupes of contemporary dance.

Among the theatre troupes are the Compagnie Jean-Duceppe, the Théâtre La Rubrique, and the Théâtre Le Grenier. In addition to the network of cultural centres in Quebec, the venues include the Monument-National and the Rideau Vert (green curtain) Theatre in Montreal, and the Trident Theatre in Quebec City. The National Theatre School of Canada and the Conservatoire de musique et d'art dramatique du Québec form the future players.

Several circus troupes were created in recent decades, the most important being the Cirque du Soleil. Among these troops are contemporary, travelling and on-horseback circuses, such as Les 7 Doigts de la Main, Cirque Éloize, Cavalia, Kosmogonia, Saka and Cirque Akya. The National Circus School and the École de cirque de Québec were created to train future Contemporary circus artists. Tohu, la Cité des Arts du Cirque was founded in 2004 to disseminate the circus arts.

Comedy is a vast cultural sector. Quebec has created and is home to several different comedy festivals, including the Just for Laughs festival in Montreal, as well as the Grand Rire festivals of Quebec, Gatineau and Sherbrooke.

Media

The Cinémathèque québécoise has a mandate to promote the film and television heritage of Quebec. The National Film Board of Canada (NFB), a federal Crown corporation, provides for the same mission in Canada. The Association of Film and Television in Quebec (APFTQ) promotes independent production in film and television. While the Association of Producers and Directors of Quebec (APDQ) represents the business of filmmaking and television, the Association of Community Radio Broadcasters of Quebec (ARCQ) (French acronym) represents the independent radio stations. Several movie theatres across Quebec ensure the dissemination of Quebec cinema. With its cinematic installations, such as the Cité du cinéma and Mel's studios, the city of Montreal is home to the filming of various productions. The state corporation Télé-Québec, the federal Crown corporation CBC, general and specialized private channels, networks, independent and community radio stations broadcast the various Quebec téléromans, the national and regional news, and other programming. Les Rendez-vous du cinéma québécois is a festival surrounding the ceremony of the Jutra Awards Night that rewards work and personalities of Quebec cinema. The Artis and the Gemini Awards gala recognize the personalities of television and radio industry in Quebec and French Canada. The Film Festival of the 3 Americas, the Festival of International Short Film, the World Film Festival and the Festival of New Cinema are other annual events surrounding the film industry in Quebec.

Many popular Québécois comedy shows exist, such as Cré Basile, Le zoo du Capitaine Bonhomme, Lundi des Ha! Ha !, Démons du midi, La petite vie, Les Bougon, and Le sketch show. There are also many comedy and cartoon shows for children, such as La boîte à surprise, Bobino, Le pirate Maboule, Fanfreluche, La Ribouldingue, Les 100 Tours de Centour, Patofville, Passe-Partout, Robin et Stella, Iniminimagimo, Vazimolo, Télé-Pirate, Bibi et Geneviève, Watatatow, Caillou, Cornemuse, Macaroni tout garni, Toc toc toc, Ramdam, and Tactik.

In the realm of literature and international publishing, the Québec Édition group is a committee created by the National Association of Book Editors dedicated to the international influence of French-language publishings from Quebec and Canada.

Literature and folklore

Quebec's French-speaking populace has the second largest body of folktales in Canada (the first being First Nations). When the early settlers arrived from France in the 17th century, they brought with them popular tales from their homeland, which were adapted to the local context. Many were passed on through generations by what French speaking Québécois refer to as raconteurs, or storytellers. Almost all of the stories native to Quebec were influenced by Christian dogma and superstitions. The Devil, for instance, appears often as either a person, an animal or monster, or indirectly through Demonic acts. Various tales and stories are told through oral tradition, such as, among many more, the legends of the Bogeyman, the Chasse-galerie, the Black Horse of Trois-Pistoles, the Complainte de Cadieux, the Corriveau, the dancing devil of Saint-Ambroise, the Giant Beaupré, the monsters of the lakes Pohénégamook and Memphremagog, of Quebec Bridge (called the Devil's Bridge), the Rocher Percé and of Rose Latulipe, for example.

From New France, Quebec literature was first developed in the travel accounts of explorers. The Moulin à paroles traces the great texts that have shaped the history of Quebec. The first to write the history of Quebec, since its discovery, was the historian François-Xavier Garneau. Many Quebec poets and prominent authors marked their era and today remain anchored in the collective imagination, like, among others, Philippe Aubert de Gaspé, Octave Crémazie, Honoré Beaugrand, Émile Nelligan, Lionel Groulx, Gabrielle Roy, Hubert Aquin, Michel Tremblay, Marie Laberge, Fred Pellerin and Gaston Miron. The regional novel from Quebec is called Terroir novel and is a literary tradition specific to the province.

Popular French-language contemporary writers include Louis Caron, Suzanne Jacob, Yves Beauchemin, and Gilles Archambault. Well-known English-language writers from Quebec include Leonard Cohen, Mordecai Richler, and Neil Bissoondath.

Art and architecture

The art of Quebec has developed around the specific characteristics of its landscapes and cultural, historical, social and political representations. The development of Quebec masterpieces in painting, printmaking and sculpture is marked by the contribution of artists such as Louis-Philippe Hébert, Cornelius Krieghoff, Alfred Laliberté, Marc-Aurèle Fortin, Marc-Aurèle de Foy Suzor-Coté, Jean Paul Lemieux, Clarence Gagnon, Adrien Dufresne, Alfred Pellan, Jean-Philippe Dallaire, Charles Daudelin, Arthur Villeneuve, Jean-Paul Riopelle, Paul-Émile Borduas and Marcelle Ferron.

The fine arts of Quebec are displayed at the Quebec National Museum of Fine Arts, the Montreal Museum of Contemporary Art, the Montreal Museum of Fine Arts, the Quebec Salon des métiers d'art and in many art galleries. The Montreal School of Fine Arts forms the painters, printmakers and sculptors of Quebec.

Québécois architecture is characterized by its unique Canadien-style buildings as well as the juxtaposition of a variety of styles reflective of Quebec's history. When walking in any city or town, one can come across buildings with styles congruent to Classical, Neo-Gothic, Roman, Neo-Renaissance, Greek Revival, Neo-Classical, Québécois Neo-Classical, Victorian, Second Empire, Modern, Post-modern or Skyscrapers.

Canadien-style houses and barns were developed by the first settlers of New France along the banks of the Saint Lawrence River. These buildings are rectangular one-storey structures with an extremely tall and steep roof, sometimes almost twice as tall as the house below. Canadien-style churches also developed and served as landmarks while traversing rural Quebec.

Heritage

Several sites, houses and historical works reflect the cultural heritage of Quebec, such as the Village Québécois d'Antan, the historical village of Val-Jalbert, the Fort Chambly, the national home of the Patriots, the Chicoutimi pulp mill (Pulperie de Chicoutimi), the Lachine Canal and the Victoria Bridge. As of December 2011, there are 190 National Historic Sites of Canada in Quebec. These sites were designated as being of national historic significance.

Various museums tell the cultural history of Quebec, like the Museum of Civilization, the Museum of French America, the McCord Museum or the Montreal Museum of Archaeology and History in Pointe-à-Callière, displaying artifacts, paintings and other remains from the past of Quebec. Notable schools include the Conservatoire de musique et d'art dramatique du Québec, the École nationale de théâtre du Canada and the École nationale de cirque. Notable public agencies to catalogue and further develop Québécois culture include the Bibliothèque et Archives nationales du Québec, the Conseil des arts et des lettres du Québec and Télé-Québec. The Association Quebecoise des Loisirs Folkloriques is an organization committed to preserving and disseminating Quebec's folklore heritage.

Cuisine

The traditional Quebecois cuisine descends from 16th-century French cuisine, the fur trade and a history of hunting. Quebec's cuisine has also been influenced by learning from First Nation, by English cuisine and by American cuisine. Quebec is most famous for its tourtière, pâté chinois, poutine, and St. Catherine's taffy among others. "Le temps des sucres" is a period during springtime when many Quebecers go to the sugar shack (cabane à sucre) for a traditional meal.

Quebec is the world's biggest maple syrup producer. The province has a long history of producing maple syrup, and creating new maple-derived products. Other major food products include beer, wine (including ice wine and ice cider), and cheese (notably Oka cheese).

Sports

Sports in Quebec constitutes an essential dimension of Quebec culture. Ice hockey remains the national sport. This sport was played for the first time on March 3, 1875, in Montreal and has been promoted over the years by numerous achievements, including the centenary of the Montreal Canadiens. Other major sports include Canadian football with the Montreal Alouettes, soccer with Club de Foot Montréal, the Grand Prix du Canada Formula 1 racing with drivers such as Gilles Villeneuve and Jacques Villeneuve, and professional baseball with the former Montreal Expos. Quebec has hosted several major sporting events, including the 1976 Summer Olympics, the Fencing World Championships in 1967, track cycling in 1974, and the Transat Québec-Saint-Malo race created in 1984.

Quebec athletes have performed well at the Winter Olympics over recent years. They won 12 of Canada's 29 medals at the most recent Winter Olympics in Pyeongchang (2018); they won 12 of the 27 Canadian medals in Sochi (2014); and 9 of the 26 Canadian medals in Vancouver (2010).

Holidays and symbols

St-Jean-Baptiste Day is one of Quebec's biggest holidays. On this day, the song "Gens du pays", by Gilles Vigneault, is often heard. The song À la claire fontaine was the anthem of the New France, Patriots and French Canadian, then replaced by O Canada, but "Gens du pays" is preferred by many Quebecers to be the national anthem of Quebec.

National Patriots' Day, a statutory holiday in Quebec, is also a unique public holiday, which honours the patriotes with displays of the patriote flag, music, public speeches, and ceremonies. Le Vieux de '37 ("The Old Man of '37"), an illustration by Henri Julien that depicts a patriot of this rebellion, is sometimes added at the centre of Patriote flags. Moving Day is a tradition where leases terminate on July 1. This creates a social phenomenon where everyone seems to be moving out at the same time.

Quebecois can also have different ways of celebrating certain holidays. A good example is the Réveillon, a giant feast and party which takes place during Christmas Eve and New Year's Eve and goes on until midnight. Traditional dishes like tourtière or cipâte are offered, and rigaudon, spoon and/or violin may be played. April Fools' Day is called Poisson d'Avril ("April's Fish") because while pulling pranks is still important, there is another major tradition: sticking fish-shaped paper cutouts to people's backs without them noticing.

In 1939, the government of Quebec unilaterally ratified its coat of arms to reflect Quebec's political history: French rule (gold lily on blue background), followed by British rule (lion on red background), followed by Canadian rule (maple leaves). Je me souviens ("I remember") is an official part of the coat of arms and has been the official licence plate motto since 1978, replacing the previous motto: La belle province ("the beautiful province"), still used as a nickname for the province. The fleur-de-lis, one of Quebec's most common symbols, is an ancient symbol of the French monarchy. Finally, the Great Seal of Quebec is used to authenticate documents issued by the government of Quebec.

The first members of the Saint-Jean-Baptiste Society created the Carillon Sacré-Coeur flag, which consisted of a white cross on an azure background with white fleur-de-lis in each corner and a Sacred Heart surrounded by maple leaves in the centre; it was based on the French merchant flag flown by Champlain and the Flag of Carillon. The Carillon Sacré-Coeur and French merchant flag went on to be the major inspirations for creating Quebec's current flag in 1903, called the Fleurdelisé. The Fleurdelisé replaced the Union Jack on Quebec's Parliament Building on January 21, 1948.

Three new official symbols were adopted in the late 1900s:

 Iris versicolor, the floral emblem of Quebec since 1999. It was chosen because it blooms around the time of Quebec's Fête nationale.
 The snowy owl, the avian emblem of Quebec since 1987. It was selected by the Québécois government to symbolize Quebec's winters and northern climate.
 The yellow birch, the tree emblem of Quebec since 1993. It was picked to emphasize the importance Québécois give to the forests.

Quebec's diaspora

The earliest immigrants to the Canadian prairies were French Canadians from Quebec. Most Franco-Albertans, Fransaskois and Franco-Manitobans are descended from these emigrants from Quebec.

From the mid-1800s to the Great Depression, Quebec experienced the Grande Hémorragie ("Great Hemorrhaging"), a massive emigration of 900,000 people from Quebec to New England. French Canadians often established themselves in Little Canadas in many industrial New England centers. Of the 900,000 Québécois who emigrated, about half returned. Most of the descendants of those who stayed are now assimilated, though a few Franco-Americans remain, speaking New England French.

Some tried to slow the Grande Hémorragie by redirecting people north, which resulted in the founding of many regions in Quebec (ex. Saguenay-Lac-St-Jean, Val-d'Or) but also in Northeastern Ontario. The northeastern Franco-Ontarians of today, which are primarily concentrated in Timmins, Hearst, Moosonee and Sault Sainte Marie, are the descendants of emigrants from Quebec who worked in the mines of the area. In recent times, Québécois snowbirds often migrate to southern Florida during the winter, resulting in the emergence of temporary "Québécois regions".

Notes

References

Sources

Further reading

English

French

External links

 
 Quebec government official tourist site
 

 
1867 establishments in Canada
Eastern Canada
French-speaking countries and territories
Populated places established in 1534
Provinces and territories of Canada
States and territories established in 1867